The Ambassador of the United Kingdom to Haiti is the United Kingdom's foremost diplomatic representative to the Republic of Haiti. 

From 1913 to 1922, the head of mission in Cuba also served Haiti. The British Embassy in Port-au-Prince was closed in 1966 "for reasons of economy" and the High Commissioner to Jamaica in Kingston was appointed non-resident ambassador to Haiti. Responsibility for Haiti was transferred to the ambassador to the Dominican Republic in 1999. In June 2012 the British Foreign Secretary announced that the UK was to open a new embassy in Haiti. The new embassy was opened in June 2013, but until 2015 the ambassador to the Dominican Republic remained ambassador to Haiti, with a deputy head of mission in Port-au-Prince. In 2015 a new, dedicated ambassador was appointed to Haiti, but still non-resident (she was married to the ambassador to the Dominican Republic and resided in Santo Domingo).  In 2019, Mockbul Ali OBE was appointed as both Ambassador to the Dominican Republic and non-resident Ambassador to Haiti.

List of heads of mission

Consul-General to the Republic of Hayti
 ? –1859: Thomas Ussher

Chargé d'Affaires and Consul-General to the Republic of Hayti
1859–1861: Thomas Ussher
1861–1872: Spenser St. John

Minister Resident and Consul-General to the Republic of Hayti
1872–1874: Spenser St. John
1874–1883: Robert Stuart

Consul-General for the Republic of Hayti and its Dependencies
1912–1913: Arthur Nightingale

Minister Plenipotentiary to the Republic of Hayti
1913–1919: Stephen Leech
1919–1921: William Erskine

Consul-General to the Republic of Hayti
1921–1922: Godfrey Haggard

Consul for the Republic of Hayti
1935–1938 Francis M. Shepherd
1938–1939: William R. Mackness
1939–1943: Reginald A.N. Hillyer
1943–1946: Alan A.L. Tuson
1946–1950: Augustus C. Routh
1950–1955: David J. Mill Irving

Ambassador Extraordinary and Plenipotentiary at Port-au-Prince, and Consul-General for the Republic of Hayti
1955–1959: Sidney Simmonds
1960–1962: Gerard T. Corley Smith

Consul for the Republic of Haiti
1962–1963: Henry Niblock

Ambassador Extraordinary and Plenipotentiary at Haiti 
1966–1970: Dalton Murray  
1970–1973: Sir Nick Larmour  
1973–1976: John Hennings  
1976–1981: John Drinkall  
1982–1984: Barry Smallman  
1984–1987: Sir Martin Reid  
1987–1989: Alan Payne  
1989–1995: Derek Milton  
1995–1999: Richard Thomas  
1999–2002: David Gordon Ward
2002–2006: Andrew Richard Ashcroft
2006–2009: Ian Alan Worthington
2009–2015: Steven Fisher

2015–: Sharon Campbell
2020-Present: Mockbul Ali OBE

References

External links
UK and Haiti, gov.uk

Haiti
 
United Kingdom Ambassadors